Invermay is a settlement in Perth and Kinross, Scotland.

Invermay may also refer to:
Invermay, Ontario, Canada
Invermay, Saskatchewan, Canada
Rural Municipality of Invermay No. 305, Saskatchewan, Canada
Invermay, Tasmania, Australia
Invermay FC, a sports team from Invermay, Tasmania
Invermay, Victoria, Australia
Invermay Park, Victoria, Australia
Invermay Agricultural Centre, Otago, New Zealand